Phillip Turner (born 1960) MA (Hon) (History) (1986) Auck is a New Zealand public servant and diplomat. He spent his childhood in Auckland and was educated at St Peter's College and Auckland University. Turner worked for the New Zealand Ministry of Foreign Affairs from 1986 to 1999. He held various senior management positions in Fonterra from 2000, culminating as Fonterra director of global stakeholder affairs from 2015 to 2018. Turner became the New Zealand ambassador to Korea (North Korea and South Korea), resident in Seoul, in April 2018.

References

1960 births
People educated at St Peter's College, Auckland
Living people
New Zealand public servants
New Zealand diplomats
Ambassadors of New Zealand to South Korea
Ambassadors of New Zealand to North Korea
Gay diplomats